
Year 608 (DCVIII) was a leap year starting on Monday (link will display the full calendar) of the Julian calendar. The denomination 608 for this year has been used since the early medieval period, when the Anno Domini calendar era became the prevalent method in Europe for naming years.

Events 
 By place 
 Byzantine Empire 
 Heraclian revolt: Heraclius the Elder, exarch of Africa, and his son (also named Heraclius) revolt against Emperor Phocas, whose regime in Constantinople has become unpopular and violent. 
 Heraclius proclaims himself and his son as consuls, claiming the imperial title—and mint coins with the two wearing the consular robes. Syria and Palaestina Prima revolt.
 Byzantine–Persian War: King Khosrau II invades Armenia, and raids deep into Anatolia through the Byzantine provinces of Cappadocia, Phrygia, Galatia, and Bithynia.

 Europe 
 August 1 – The Column of Phocas at Rome is dedicated in honour of Phocas. The Corinthian column has a height of 13.6 m (44 ft).

 Britain 
 Eochaid Buide succeeds his father Áedán mac Gabráin as king of Dál Riata (modern Scotland).

 Asia 
 Sui Dynasty Emperor Yang of Sui expresses the desire to control routes to the West, leading to two and a half centuries of Chinese military and trading activities in Central Asia.

 By topic 
 Religion 
 September 25 – Pope Boniface IV succeeds Boniface III, as the 67th pope of Rome.
 The observance of Halloween in the Roman Catholic Church is first recorded.
 The Georgian Orthodox Church returns to Chalcedonism (approximate date).

Births 
 Charibert II, king of Aquitaine (approximate date)
 Philibert of Jumièges, Frankish abbot (approximate date)

Deaths 
 Áedán mac Gabráin, king of Dál Riata

References

Sources